Anna Andrejuvová (born 5 January 1980 in Svidník) is a Slovak politician serving as a member of the National Council in the Ordinary People and Independent Personalities caucus since 2020.

Early life 
Andrejuvová grew up in Svidník and Bardejov. In 2004 she graduated in political science at the University of Trnava. In 2009 she graduated in law at the Pan-European University.

Political career 
From 2012 to 2020 she served as an aide to MP Daniel Lipšic. In the 2020 Slovak parliamentary election, she was elected an MP on the Ordinary People and Independent Personalities list.

References 

OĽaNO politicians
New Majority (Slovakia) politicians
Slovak jurists
Living people
1980 births
People from Svidník
Members of the National Council (Slovakia) 2020-present
Female members of the National Council (Slovakia)
21st-century Slovak politicians
21st-century Slovak women politicians